Madime (Wedding) is a Tulu language film directed by Vijaykumar Kodialbail starring Likith Shetty and Ramya Barna in lead roles. Madime is produced by Megina Malady Balakrishna Shetty.

The movie was reported to be remade in Marathi, thereby becoming the first Tulu to be remade in other language. The film was released on 20 November 2014.

Cast

Likith Shetty 
Ramya Barna 
Umesh Mijar
Navya
Usha Bhandary
Bhojaraj Vamanjoor
Jayarama Acharya
Santosh Shetty
Chetan Rai Mani
Raghavendra Rai
Sandeep Shetty Maibettu
Prasanna Bailoor
Sunil Nelligudde
Manju Rai Muloor
Rohini Jagaram
Ramesh Kalladka
Dayanand Kulal Urwa
Arun Shetty Mangaladevi
Yadav Mannagudde
Vinod Yekkur
Mangesh Bhat Vittal
Harish Moodbidri

References

External links

Tulu films remade in other languages